Wijaya Kusuma University, Surabaya or abbreviated UWKS, is a private university located in Surabaya, Indonesia. The University was established in 1980 by Soenandar Projosoedarmo, Blegoh Soemarto, and Moch. Said. This university has two programs, undergraduate and graduate programs, as well as, eight faculties. UWKS is owned by the Wijaya Kusuma Foundation.

Faculties 

 Faculty of Agriculture
 Undergraduate Program of Agrotechnology
 Undergraduate Program of Agrobusiness
 Faculty of Engineering
 Undergraduate Program of Civil Engineering
 Undergraduate Program of Information Technology
 Undergraduate Program of Food Industry 
 Faculty of Economics 
 Undergraduate Program of Economic Development
 Undergraduate Program of Management 
 Undergraduate Program of Accounting
 Faculty of Medicine
 Faculty of Law
 Faculty of Political Science
 Undergraduate Program of Sociology
 Undergraduate Program of Political Studies
 Undergraduate Program of Social Welfare
 Undergraduate Program of Library Science
 Faculty of Language and Science
 Undergraduate Program of Indonesian Studies
 Undergraduate Program of English Studies
 Undergraduate Program of Mathematics 
 Undergraduate Program of Biology
 Undergraduate Program of Elementary Education
 School of Veterinary Medicine
Graduate School of Law
Graduate School of Accounting
Graduate School of Agribusiness
Graduate School of Political Science

Reference

Further reading

 "UWKS Terapkan Kampus Merdeka" Suara Surabaya.
 "Terima MURI, UWKS Kukuhkan Diri Sebagai Kampus Budaya" Suara Surabaya.

External links
 University Homepage
 ResearchGate Profile

Private universities and colleges in Indonesia
Universities in East Java
1980 establishments in Indonesia
Educational institutions in Surabaya